Gerald Francis Hayes (9 November 1914 – 26 September 1971) was an Australian rules footballer who played with Richmond and South Melbourne in the Victorian Football League (VFL).

Notes

External links 

1914 births
1971 deaths
Australian rules footballers from Ballarat
Richmond Football Club players
Sydney Swans players
South Ballarat Football Club players